Jorge de Souza can refer to:

 Jorge de Souza (footballer)
 Jorge de Souza (volleyball)